The University of Calgary Students' Union is an organization representing students at the University of Calgary. Every Undergraduate registered at the University of Calgary is a member of the Students' Union. The Students' Union is a multifaceted organization serving as part student government, part lobby group, and part business. Students are elected to serve on the Students' Union for one year following elections held each March.

Students' Legislative Council
The Students' Union's highest governing body is the Students' Legislative Council and it is where all resolutions, major policies, and positions are voted on. It consists of the five executives and 19 faculty representatives.

SLC also delegates authority to different committees to ensure it maintains transparency and efficient functioning.

Current 2022-2023 Students' Legislative Council

 Non-Voting Officials

Faculty Representation
There are currently 19 Faculty Representatives on the Students' Legislative Council which is based on a representation by population model. Every undergraduate faculty is represented by at least one Faculty Representative with a representative gained for every 2000 students in a given faculty. All faculties with less than 2000 students registered have one Faculty Representative. Once a faculty reaches the 2000 student threshold it will have two representatives and when a faculty reaches the 4000 student threshold it will have three representatives etc.

Faculty representation is as follows:
 4 Faculty of Arts
 3 Faculty of Science
 2 Faculty of Business
 2 Faculty of Engineering
 1 Faculty of Education
 1 Faculty of Kinesiology
 1 Faculty of Law
 2 Faculty of Medicine
 1 Faculty of Nursing
 1 Faculty of Social Work
 1 Faculty of Veterinary Medicine

Provincial and Federal Representation
Federally, the University of Calgary Students' Union participates in the Canadian Alliance of Students Associations and provincially, they are a member of the Council of Alberta University Students.

Operations
As a student-led and staff-run organization supported by student volunteers, the Students' Union  has a diverse organizational structure to manage the scope of its businesses, services, programs, and events. Under the direction of elected student leaders, the SU has a team of approximately 50 full-time staff, more than 200 part-time staff, and more than 300 volunteers who deliver a wide range of services to the organization and undergraduate students. The SU operates MacEwan Student Centre and has services including Bound and Copied (the campus copy centre and cheap book store), Stör (a convenience store), the Den and Black Lounge (a full-service restaurant and bar), the Campus Food Bank, “Mac Hall" concert facilities, and MacEwan Conference and Event Centre within the building. The proceeds of these operations are reinvested directly into SU student programs, awards, and events. Additional services include the off-campus housing registry, campus lost and found, travel and conference funding, campus "Safewalk," various awareness weeks, Cinemania movie nights, and the time-honoured end-of-year tradition "Bermuda Shorts Day."

Dispute Over MacHall
The Student Union at the University of Calgary is currently in a dispute with the university itself over the ownership over the MacHall. The Students Union claims that they own 55% of the building, back from an agreement back in 1969, while the university denies this. Though the students union attempted to solve the issue quietly, there had been on-going negotiations around MacHall, on October 21, 2015, the SU sued the University of Calgary over the dispute. In the past, the University wanted to treat the SU as tenants, as opposed to the partial owners of the building, and the University the sole owners but the SU refused because it would lower their revenue and not allow them to decide what the building is used for. In 2018, the dispute was settled, with the SU receiving expanded rights to manage the building perpetually for the life of the building.

See also
 List of Alberta students' associations
 The Quality Money Conflict of 2016

References

External links

 
 Official student newspaper
 University Site

Calgary
Students' Union
Organizations based in Calgary